Eudoraea adriatica is a Gram-negative, aerobic and non-motile bacterium from the genus of Eudoraea which has been isolated from water from the coast of the Adriatic Sea.

References 

Flavobacteria
Bacteria described in 2008